Devils Lake Wetland Management District is located in the heart of the Prairie Pothole Region of the United States. The District was established in 1962 to purchase and protect wetland habitat for migratory waterfowl and other wildlife in northeastern North Dakota. One of the primary objectives of Devils Lake Wetland Management District is to provide wetland and grassland habitat for waterfowl in the spring and summer for nesting and feeding. The other primary objective is to provide migration habitat for waterfowl in the spring and fall.

The District's headquarters is in Devils Lake, North Dakota. Counties within the District include Benson, Cavalier, Grand Forks, Pembina, Ramsey, Towner and Walsh.

References
District website

National Wildlife Refuges in North Dakota
Protected areas of Benson County, North Dakota
Protected areas of Cavalier County, North Dakota
Protected areas of Grand Forks County, North Dakota
Protected areas of Pembina County, North Dakota
Protected areas of Ramsey County, North Dakota
Protected areas of Towner County, North Dakota
Protected areas of Walsh County, North Dakota